Tenna can refer to:

Places
 Tenna, Nordland, an island in Nordland county, Norway
 Tenna, Switzerland, a former municipality in Switzerland
 Tenna, Trentino, a municipality in Trentino, Italy
 Tenna (river), a river in Marche, Italy, flowing into the Adriatic Sea

Other
 Tenna (天和), a Japanese era name for a period spanning the years from 1681 through 1684